Cesare Toraldo (born 6 July 1963) is an Italian modern pentathlete. He competed in the men's individual event at the 1996 Summer Olympics.

References

1963 births
Living people
Italian male modern pentathletes
Olympic modern pentathletes of Italy
Modern pentathletes at the 1996 Summer Olympics
Sportspeople from Rome